

Atlantic Ocean

Amazon River Basin

 Amazon River 
 Guainía River or Negro River
 Vaupés River or Uaupés River
 Papuri River
 Querary River
 Isana River or Içana River
 Cuiari River
 Aquio River
 Caquetá River or Japurá River
 Purui River
 Apaporis River
 Traíra River or Taraira River
 Tunia River
 Ajajú River
 Miritiparaná River
 Cahuinari River
 Yarí River
 Caguán River
 Guayas River
 Mecaya River
 Orteguaza River
 Putumayo River or Içá River
 Cotuhé River 
 Igara Paraná River
 Cara Paraná River
 San Miguel River
 Guamués River

Orinoco River Basin

 Orinoco River 
 Apure River (Venezuela)
 Sarare River
 Arauca River 
 Capanaparo River
 Cinaruco River
 Meta River 
 Vita River
 Casanare River
 Ariporo River
 Cravo Norte River
 Guachiría River
 Pauto River
 Cravo Sur River
 Cusiana River
 Manacacías River
 Metica River
 Guayuriba River
 Upía River
 Guavio River
 Lengupá River
 Tomo River
 Tuparro River
 Vichada River
 Guaviare River 
 Inírida River
 Papunáua River
 Uvá River
 Ariari River
 Güejar River
 Guayabero River
 Duda River
 Losada River

Lake Maracaibo

 Catatumbo River
 Zulia River
 Pamplonita River
 Táchira River
 Tibú River
 Sardinata River
 Tarra River
 Río de Oro

Caribbean Sea
 Atrato River
 Salaqúí River
 Sucio River
 Bojayá River
 Murrí River
 Fundación River
 Leon River

< Canal del Dique (Levee Channel) - artificial bifurcation
 Magdalena River
 Cesar River
 Ariguaní River
 Guatapurí River
 San Jorge River
 Cauca River
 Nechi River
 Porce River
 Medellín River
 Otun River
 La Vieja River
 Quindío River
 Cali River
 Jamundí River
 Pance River
 Lebrija River
 Sogamoso River
 Chicamocha River
 Suárez River
 Opon River
 Carare River
 Nare River
 Samaná Norte River
Guatapé River
 La Miel River
 Negro River 
 Bogotá River
 Soacha River
 Bojacá River
 Subachoque River
 Tunjuelo River
 Fucha River
 Arzobispo River, Juan Amarillo or Salitre
 Río Frío
 Teusacá River
 Neusa River
 Sumapaz River
 Cuja River
 Guavio River
 Batán River
 Saldaña River
 Cabrera River
 Ceibas River
Páez River
 Mendihuaca River
 Mulatos River
 Palomino River
 Ranchería River
 Sinú River

Pacific Ocean

 Baudó River
 San Juan River
 Dagua River
 Anchicayá River
 Yurumanguí River
 San Juan de Micay River
 Iscuandé River
 Tapaje River
 Sanquianga River
 Patía River
 Telembí River
 Guáitara River
 Mayo River
 Mira River
 Güiza River
 San Juan River

See also
 List of rivers of the Americas by coastline

References

Rand McNally, The New International Atlas, 1993.
 GEOnet Names Server

 
Colombia
Rivers of Colombia